Kule is a small village in Raigad, Sangameshwar tehsil of district Ratnagiri.

Overview

The nearest bus stand is Sangameshwar S.T. Stand (M.S.R.T.C.) nearly 18 km.

References

Cities and towns in Ratnagiri district
Talukas in Maharashtra
Ratnagiri district